Embrace the Chaos is the second studio album by the American rock band Ozomatli, released on September 11, 2001 on Interscope Records.

Track listing
 "Pá Lante" (Ozomatli) – 5:03
 "1234" (José Espinoza, David Jolicoeur, Kelvin Mercer, Ozomatli) – 3:07
featuring De La Soul
 "Dos Cosas Ciertas" (Espinoza, Andy Mendoza, Ozomatli, Anthony Stout) – 3:28
featuring Kanetic Source
 "Vocal Artillery" (Espinoza, Medusa, Ozomatli, Stout, will.i.am)– 4:59
featuring Medusa, will.i.am, and Kanetic Source
 "Guerrillero" (Espinoza, David Hidalgo, Ozomatli, Louie Pérez, Bob Power) – 4:29
 "Embrace the Chaos" (Lonnie Rashid Lynn Jr., Espinoza, Ozomatli) – 4:18
featuring Common
 "Pensativo (Interlude)" (Asdru Sierra) – 2:33
 "Tímido" (Espinoza, Mendoza, Ozomatli) – 5:18
 "Lo Que Dice" (Espinoza, Ozomatli, Stout) – 3:20
 "Mi Alma" (Espinoza, Mendoza, Ozomatli) – 5:09
 "Sueños en Realidad" (Espinoza, Mendoza, Ozomatli) – 3:21

Personnel
Ozomatli
Wil-Dog Abers – electric bass, guitar, Ampeg Baby Bass, vocals
Ulises Bella – bass clarinet, guitar, piano, saxophone (baritone and tenor), vocals
Andy Mendoza – drums
Raúl Pacheco – guitar, jarana, tres, vocals
Justin Porée – percussion, rap, vocals
Asdru Sierra – trumpet, vocals
Jiro Yamaguchi – percussion, tabla, vocals

Additional musicians
Common - rap on "Embrace the Chaos"
Cut Chemist – turntables
De La Soul – rap on "1234"
David Hidalgo – violin
Harry Kim – trumpet
Prince Diabaté – kora
Walter Miranda – piano
Bob Power – slide guitar, Fender Rhodes
Alberto Salas – piano
Arturo Velasco – trombone

Technical personnel
Steve Berlin – producing
Ryan Boesch – assistant engineer
Kevin Breen – assistant engineer
Robert Breen – assistant engineer
Mario Caldato Jr. – producing, mixing
Robert Carranza – engineer, mixing
Tom Coyne – mastering
Kevin Dean – assistant engineer
Dave McNair – engineer, mixing
Sean Murphy – photography
Ozomatli – producing
Justin Porée – drum programming
Bob Power – producer, engineer, mixing
Francesca Restrepo – Art direction, design
Alberto Salas – arranger
Peter Young – photography, cover photo

Awards and chart performance
Embrace the Chaos was awarded the Grammy for Best Latin Rock/Alternative Album in 2002.

References

2001 albums
Ozomatli albums
Interscope Records albums
Grammy Award for Best Latin Rock, Urban or Alternative Album
Albums produced by Mario Caldato Jr.